The  is a formula racing class in Japan. The class was founded in 1993 by the Japan Automobile Federation as a class above the FJ1600 and below the former All-Japan Formula Three Championship and the current Formula Regional Japanese Championship and Super Formula Lights.

Car
The Japanese Formula 4 is an open chassis class, open for all chassis manufacturers. Since 2012 the engines have a maximum capacity of 2,000cc. Currently the cars are allowed to be fitted with a Honda K20A, Toyota 3ZR or Nissan SR20 engine. Since 2010 the cars use a monocoque chassis instead of a tube frame. In the first year of the monocoque chassis most cars were West Racing Cars.

Champion

External links
 Japan Formula 4 Japanese
 Japan Scholarship System Formula 4

Auto racing series in Japan
Formula racing
Formula racing series
Recurring sporting events established in 1993